Montgomery Mall is a two-story shopping mall located in the community of Montgomeryville in Montgomery Township, Pennsylvania  near the borough of North Wales. The mall, owned by Kohan Retail Investment Group, is located along Pennsylvania Route 309 (Bethlehem Pike) at the intersection with U.S. Route 202 Business (Dekalb Pike), amidst other commercial development. It contains over 90 stores and eateries and is anchored by Dick's Sporting Goods, JCPenney, Macy's, and Wegmans.

History

The Montgomery Mall was built in 1977 by The Kravco Company. In 1986, Bamberger's became Macy's. In 1995, the Wanamaker's store became Hecht's. Hecht's became Strawbridge's in 1997 after its parent company, May Department Stores, acquired the Strawbridge's chain. Simon Property Group acquired the Montgomery Mall in 2003.

Strawbridge's closed in 2006 as a result of Federated Department Stores acquiring May Department Stores, with Boscov's taking over the former store in 2007. The Boscov's store closed in October 2008 as part of their restructuring. Dick's Sporting Goods was also added in 2008. In November 2011, it was announced that a  Wegmans would replace the vacant Boscov's. This store was planned to be the first Wegmans located in a shopping mall. The former Boscov's store was demolished in the process of constructing the new Wegmans. The Wegmans store opened on November 3, 2013.

The Montgomery Mall has recently gone under reconstruction. This renovation had a cost of $8 million and the main purpose was to redesign exterior and entrance, restrooms and upgrade lighting.

On November 7, 2019, it was announced that the Sears store at Montgomery Mall would close as part of a plan to close 96 stores nationwide. Liquidation sales began on December 2, 2019. The store closed in February 2020. On May 3, 2021, during the COVID-19 pandemic, Montgomery County opened a COVID-19 vaccination site in the former Sears space.

In June 2021, the Montgomery Mall was foreclosed upon by Wilmington Trust, trustee for Wells Fargo Commercial Mortgage. The mall was placed into receivership by June 22, with JLL taking over management of the mall, and a $118.78 million judgment was issued against Simon Property Group affiliate Mall at Montgomery, LP by July 12. In order to satisfy the loan, the mall was sold to Kohan Retail Investment Group on November 20, 2021 for $55 million. In 2022, Kohan Retail Investment Group sold the Wegmans site at the mall to ExchangeRight for $22.6 million. 

In recent years, the Montgomery Mall has seen a decrease in foot traffic and an increase in the vacancy rate. Kohan Retail Investment Group has released no plans regarding the future of the mall.

Anchors

Current

Dick's Sporting Goods — Opened in 2008
JCPenney — Opened in 1977
Macy's  - Opened in 1986
Wegmans  - Opened in 2013

Former
Boscov's - opened in 2007, closed in 2008 and later demolished and replaced with Wegmans in 2013
Strawbridge's - Opened in 1997, closed in 2006, converted to Boscov's in 2007
Hecht's - Opened in 1995 and converted to Strawbridge's in 1997 
Bamberger's - Opened in 1977 and converted to Macy's in 1986
Wanamaker's - Opened in 1977 and converted to Hecht's in 1995
Tweeter - Junior anchor, closed in 2008
Sears - Opened in 1977, closed in 2020

References

External links

Official Website

Shopping malls in Pennsylvania
Shopping malls established in 1977
Tourist attractions in Montgomery County, Pennsylvania
Buildings and structures in Montgomery County, Pennsylvania
1977 establishments in Pennsylvania
Kohan Retail Investment Group